The 2007 IIHF World U18 Championship Division I were a pair of international under-18 ice hockey tournaments run by the International Ice Hockey Federation. The Division I tournaments made up the second level of competition at the 2007 IIHF World U18 Championships. The Group A tournament took place between 6 April and 12 April 2007 in Maribor, Slovenia and the Group B tournament took place between 4 April and 10 April 2007 in Sanok, Poland. Belarus and Denmark won the Group A and Group B tournaments respectively and gained promotion to the Championship Division for the 2008 IIHF World U18 Championships. While France finished last in Group A and Great Britain last in Group B and were both relegated to Division II for 2008.

Group A tournament
The Group A tournament began on 6 April 2007 in Maribor, Slovenia. Austria, France, Kazakhstan and Slovenia all returned to compete in this years Division I tournament after missing promotion to the Championship Division at the previous years World Championships. Italy gained promotion to Division I after finished first in last years Division II Group A tournament and Belarus was relegated from the Championship Division after failing to survive the relegation round at the 2006 IIHF World U18 Championships.

Belarus won the tournament after winning all five of their games and gained promotion to the Championship Division for the 2008 IIHF World U18 Championships. Slovenia finished second after winning three of their five games and Kazakhstan finished in third place. France finished in last place, managing to only win one game in overtime and were relegated to Division II for the 2007 IIHF World U18 Championships. Andrey Yankov of Kazakhstan led the tournament in goaltending with a save percentage of 0.903, and was named the top goaltender by the IIHF directorate. Slovenia's Blaž Gregorc was named as top defenceman and Mikhail Stefanovich of Belarus was selected as top forward. Stefanovich also was the tournaments leading scorer with twelve points including nine goals and three assists.

Standings

Fixtures
All times local.

Scoring leaders

List shows the top ten skaters sorted by points, then goals.

Leading goaltenders
Only the top five goaltenders, based on save percentage, who have played at least 40% of their team's minutes are included in this list.

Group B tournament
The Group B tournament began on 4 April 2007 in Sanok, Poland. Denmark, Japan, Poland and Ukraine all returned to compete in this years Division I tournament after missing promotion to the Championship Division at the previous years World Championships. Great Britain gained promotion to Division I after finishing first in last years Division II Group B tournament and Norway was relegated from the Championship Division after failing to survive the relegation round at the 2006 IIHF World U18 Championships.

Denmark won the tournament after winning all five of their games and gained promotion to the Championship Division for the 2008 IIHF World U18 Championships. Japan finished second after losing only to Denmark and Norway finished in third place. Great Britain finished in last place after losing all five of their games and were relegated back to Division II for the 2008 IIHF World U18 Championships. Mikkel Bødker of Denmark led the tournament in scoring, recording eleven points, and was named the tournament's most valuable player and top forward by the IIHF directorate. Japan's Takumi Kamikawa was named to goaltender and Oliver Lauridsen of Denmark was selected as top defenceman. Denmark's Frederik Andersen was the tournament's leading goaltender with a save percentage of 0.937.

Standings

Fixtures
All times local.

Scoring leaders

List shows the top ten skaters sorted by points, then goals.

Leading goaltenders
Only the top five goaltenders, based on save percentage, who have played at least 40% of their team's minutes are included in this list.

References

World
World
I
International ice hockey competitions hosted by Poland
International ice hockey competitions hosted by Slovenia
IIHF World U18 Championship Division I